Schloss Straßburg is a castle in Straßburg, Carinthia, Austria.

Today the castle hosts changing museum exhibits, and houses several ethnographic collections.  On permanent display are rural life objects, including rustic furniture, kitchen gadgets, tools and household equipment, a collection of textiles from the mid-19th to mid-20th centuries, and a collection of smoking pipes.

See also
List of castles in Austria

References

This article was initially translated from the German Wikipedia.

External links
 Schloss Straßburg 

Castles in Carinthia (state)
Museums in Carinthia (state)
History museums in Austria